Schinia hanga is a moth of the family Noctuidae. It is found in North America, including Kansas, Oklahoma and Texas.

The wingspan is about 28 mm.

External links
Images
Butterflies and Moths of North America

Schinia
Moths of North America
Moths described in 1898